Honnihal or Honnihalli may refer to:

 Honnihal, Bagankot, a village in Bilagi Talaku, Bagalkot District, Karnataka, India
 Honnihal, Belgaum, a village in Belgaum Talaku, Belgaum District, Karnataka, India
 Honnihalli, a village in Hukeri Talaku, Belgaum District, Karnataka, India

See also
 Hire Honnihalli, Hirehonnihalli, a village in Kalghatgi Taluka, Dharwad District, Karnataka, India
 Madki Honnihalli, Madkihonnihalli, a village in Kalghatgi Taluka, Dharwad District, Karnataka, India
 Tabakad Honnihalli, Tabakadhonnihalli, a village in Kalghatgi Taluka, Dharwad District, Karnataka, India